Lynge-Frederiksborg Herred (Lynge-Frederiksborg Herred Hundred) was an administrative division in Frederiksborg County in the northern part of the island of  Zealand, Denmark. It was created when Lynge Herred was divided into Lynge-Frederiksborg Herred and Lynge-Kronborg Herred in 1862 and disappeared with the adoption of the Administration of Justice Act (Retsplejeloven) in 1919. The market towns in Lynge-Frederiksborg Herred were Hillerød and Frederikssund.

Parishes
The following present-day parishes are located in the former Lynge-Frederiksborg Herred:
 Frederiksborg Castle Parish
 Frederikssund Parish
 Græse Parish
 Gørløse Parish
 Hillerød Parish
 Islebjerg Sogn (not shown on the map)
 Jørlunde Parish
 Lillerød Parish
 Lynge Parish
 Nørre Herlev Parish
 Oppe Sundby Parish
 Præstevang Parish
 Sigerslevvester Parish
 Slangerup Parish
 Uggeløse Parish
 Ullerød Parish (not shown on the map)
 Uvelse Parish

See also
 Hundreds of Denmark

References

External links

Hundreds of Denmark
1862 establishments in Denmark
Allerød Municipality
Frederikssund Municipality
Hillerød Municipality